= Sakharoli =

Village in Maharashtra

- Village
- Interactive map of Sakharoli
- Country: India
- State: Maharashtra

Sakharoli is a small village in Ratnagiri district, Maharashtra state in Western India. The 2011 Census of India recorded 962 residents in the village. Sakharoli's geographical area is 773 hectares (1,910 acres).

Sakharoli Kh. is a small village in the same region. The 2011 Census of India recorded 5963887 residents in the village. Sakharoli Kh.'s geographical area is 41 hectares (100 acres).
